Mae is an American rock band that formed in Norfolk, Virginia in 2001. The band's name is an acronym for "Multi-sensory Aesthetic Experience", based on a course taken by drummer Jacob Marshall while a student at Old Dominion University.

History

Early years with Tooth and Nail (2001–2006) 
Jacob Marshall and Dave Elkins began what would become Mae by writing their first song, "Embers and Envelopes", in Marshall's living room. The band signed with Tooth and Nail Records and released their first album, Destination: Beautiful, in 2003. They released their second full-length album, The Everglow, in 2005. The band toured extensively to promote it, and also performed on the Vans Warped Tour. Mae re-released The Everglow in 2006, adding three new songs and a two-hour DVD.

Move to Capitol, Singularity, and (m)(a)(e) EPs (2006–2012) 
Later in 2006, the band signed to Capitol Records for their third full-length album. Mae began recording the album in the fall of 2006, working with producer Howard Benson (who has produced albums for Saosin, My Chemical Romance, Blindside, and Relient K). The album, titled Singularity, was released on August 14, 2007. On June 19, 2007, the band released the first single from Singularity, "Sometimes I Can't Make It Alone".

On September 24, 2007 Padgett and Sweitzer parted ways with Mae. The following year, Mae announced that they had split ways with Capitol Records. They also stated that they would embark on a new, experimental project, releasing one new song for each month of 2009. Each song would be available to download on their website for a minimum donation of $1, with proceeds going to humanitarian projects of Mae's choosing. Additionally, they would be compiling the monthly songs into three separate EPs entitled (m)orning, (a)fternoon and (e)vening, respectively.

In July 2009, Mae announced they were starting their own label called "Cell Records" through which they would release their three-EP set. In order to get in-store distribution Mae returned to their original label Tooth and Nail Records and signed a distribution agreement with the label. The (m)orning EP was released in stores and online on September 22, 2009. There was a limited edition scratch-and-sniff disk that was only available on their spring US tour and which was scented like the ocean (the band encouraged members in the crowd of their live shows to smell the disc during their song "The Ocean"). Mae released the (a)fternoon EP in stores and online March 30, 2010. The final EP, (e)vening, was initially available in a limited edition on the band's "Goodbye, Goodnight" tour. The EP was then released in stores and online on March 8, 2011 bundled with a DVD of their hometown farewell show filmed at The NorVa in Norfolk, Virginia. The farewell show features 20 songs, with songs from each of their full-length records and their three most recent EPs.

On May 7, 2010 word began spreading of Mark Padgett and Rob Sweitzer rejoining Mae for their upcoming fall tour. On June 19, 2010, Mae played a show in Singapore, the first show since 2007 that included both Mark Padgett and Rob Sweitzer. On June 22, 2010, Mae's Dave Elkins confirmed on the band's forums that Mark Padgett and Rob Sweitzer had reunited with Mae. On June 28, 2010 Mae announced that their upcoming "Goodbye, Goodnight" Tour would be their last for the foreseeable future, marking their indefinite hiatus. On August 23, 2010, the newly reunited Mae including Mark Padgett and Rob Sweitzer played their first show back home in the US at Eureka College in Eureka, Illinois, evidently gearing up for the Goodbye, Goodnight tour. On Saturday November 27, 2010, the band played what was billed as its last show at The NorVa. The show was filmed to be released on DVD. What were believed at the time to be Mae's actual final performances consisted of two shows played on February 23 and 24, 2011 at the Shibuya and Shinsaibashi locations of Club Quattro in Japan. However, in late December 2011, the band announced on its website that it would play eight shows in the UK and Europe as part of the Goodbye, Goodnight tour from January 3–10, 2012.

Continued touring, return to Tooth & Nail, and Multisensory Aesthetic Experience (2012–present) 
On February 21–23, 2013, Mae played a three show tour to commemorate the 10-year anniversary of the band's album Destination: Beautiful. Two shows took place in Virginia Beach, Virginia and one in Nashville, Tennessee. The shows consisted of the band playing their first album in its entirety. At the second Virginia Beach show, current E Street Band saxophonist and early Mae member Jacob Clemons made a guest appearance on the band's song "Tisbury Lane" during encore.

On June 7, 2014 Mae played an online show via stageit. During the concert it was announced that Mae would be reuniting in 2015 to complete a reunion tour in commemoration of the 10-year anniversary of The Everglow. They also confirmed that they were re-recording several songs for a pressing of Destination: B-Sides on vinyl rumored to be released via Spartan Records late in the summer of 2014.

Multisensory Aesthetic Experience, and was released on November 30, 2018 through the band's original record company, Tooth & Nail Records. The inspiration for this album came after the band had created a large-scale virtual reality experience at the Forbes Under30 Summit in Jerusalem. The event took place at the historic Tower of David. Dave Elkins recalled,“We performed in front of 650/700 people who all took their smartphones, put them in these cardboard viewfinders and all the visuals that they were seeing were in virtual reality 360 [which] were accommodating the music that we had written and recorded just to accommodate this experience.”

On June 26, 2018 Mae announced a fall 2018 tour which included "MAE Day" in select cities. The "MAE Day" event consisted of a short video, discussion with the band, listening party, shared meal, VR experience, and additional multi-sensory experiences. On November 27, 2018 Mae announced via a Facebook post an early 2019 tour on the west coast, with the final dates in Japan. In November 2019, the band announced on a Facebook post the "Multisensory Aesthetic (360) Experience", a partnership with TriBeCa Film Institute. On August 24, 2021, Jacob Marshall announced his departure from the band via Mae's Facebook page.

Members
Current
 Dave Elkins (born Dave Gimenez) – lead vocals, guitar (2001–present)
 Zach Gehring – guitar (2003–present)

Touring musicians
 Josiah Schlater – bass (from the bands Tokyo and Color)
 Robert Smith – keyboard (from the bands Tokyo and Musicplayer)
 David Pogge – bass (for the (a)fternoon tour)
 Tyler Strickland – guitar (for the (a)fternoon tour)
 Matt Beck – guitar (initial tour, replaced by member Zach Gehring)
 Drew Smyser – bass (winter 2017 shows, from the band Code Machine)
 Geoffrey Mutchnik - keyboard (2018-2021)
 Kipp Wilde - keyboard (2017-2018, 2021–present, from the band Windsor Drive)
 Patrick Ryan – bass and guitar (mid 2017–2021)
 Josh Grigsby - drums (2021–present, from the band Houston Calls)
 Aaron Lachman - bass (2022-present)

Former
 Jacob Marshall – drums, percussion, piano (2001–2021)
 Mark Padgett – bass guitar (2002–2007, 2010–2015)
 Rob Sweitzer – keyboards (2002–2007, 2010–2015)
 William Clark – bass (2001–2002)
 Jake Clemons – saxophone (now of the E Street Band)

Related projects
 Before forming Mae, Dave Elkins was a co-founder and lead vocalist for the indie band "Sky's the Limit". Two songs that Elkins originally wrote for Sky's the Limit have been recorded and released by Mae – "Skyline Drive", on Destination: Beautiful, and "Tisbury Lane", on Destination: B-Sides.
 After Mae finished their final tour, Dave Elkins began a new project called Schematic.
 Jacob Marshall has formed the band River James with members of the band Army of Me.
 In the fall of 2014, Mae keyboardist Rob Sweitzer announced a crowd-funding project for a solo record of his own, titled "M29", under the act name My God, It's Full of Stars.

Discography

Albums

EPs and B-sides

Singles

DVDs
 From Toledo to Tokyo (Astorya Entertainment, 2005)
 The Everglow: Special Edition DVD (Tooth & Nail Records, 2006)
 Destination: Beautiful Five Year Anniversary (Mae Recording Company, 2008)
 (M)orning (Cell Records, 2009)
 (A)fternoon (Cell Records, 2010)
 (E)vening (Cell Records, 2011)

Compilation appearances
 "Take Action! Vol. 4" (2004, contributed "Embers and Envelopes")
 Happy Christmas Vol. 4 (2005, contributed "Carol of the Bells")
 Punk Goes 90's (2006, contributed "March of the Pigs")

Song of the Month
Throughout 2009, Mae released 'Songs of the Month' (proceeds benefiting Habitat for Humanity and Donorschoose.org), with the first four tracks going onto the (M)orning EP, the second set of four going onto the (A)fternoon EP, and the final four on the (E)vening EP:

 January: "The House that Fire Built"
 February: "Boomerang"
 March: "A Melody, The Memory"
 April: "Night/Day"
 May: "Over and Over"
 June: "The Cure"
 July: "The Fight Song"
 August: "In Pieces"
 September: "I Just Needed You To Know"
 October: "Seasons"
 †November: "Sleep Well"
 †December: "Bloom"
† - Release delayed due to the theft of Mae's instruments and gear in Philadelphia

References

External links
 Mae Official Website.
 Mae on PureVolume Contains MP3s, a biography, show dates and photos.
 Mae on Virb
 Video interview with Mae for AbsolutePunk.net
 This Is Schematic
 Interview with Mae for FussMagazine.com
 Interview with Dave Elkins for freshZIVE.com

2001 establishments in Virginia
American emo musical groups
Capitol Records artists
Musical groups disestablished in 2011
Musical groups established in 2001
Musical groups reestablished in 2013
Musicians from Norfolk, Virginia
Tooth & Nail Records artists
Musical groups from Virginia
Musical quintets